was a Japanese novelist.

He attended the University of Tokyo, and upon graduation joined the staff of the literary magazine Shin-Shicho (新思潮: "New Thought") in 1950. The next year, Miura published his first book. He then married fellow Third Generation writer Ayako Sono in 1953, with whom he wrote many books about Catholicism and religion. Miura began teaching at Nihon University in 1967, the same year he was awarded the Shinchosha Prize. From 1985 to 1986, he was commissioner of the Cultural Affairs Agency. In 1999, the Japanese government designated Miura a Person of Cultural Merit. In 2004, Miura was appointed to lead the Japan Art Academy. He stepped down in 2014, and died at a hospital in Tokyo due to pneumonia on 3 February 2017, aged 91.

References

1926 births
2017 deaths
Members of the Japan Art Academy
Writers from Tokyo
Academic staff of Nihon University
University of Tokyo alumni
Deaths from pneumonia in Japan
Japanese Roman Catholics
20th-century Japanese novelists
20th-century Japanese male writers
Writers from Kōchi Prefecture
Presidents of the Japan Writers’ Association